Alexander Agyare (born 6 January 1979) is a Ghanaian politician who is a member of the New Patriotic Party. He is the member of parliament for the Kade constituency in the Eastern Region of Ghana

Early life and education 
Agyare was born in Pramkese. He holds MSC in PROCUREMENT & LOGISTIC MANAGEMENT

References 

Living people
1979 births
Ghanaian MPs 2021–2025
New Patriotic Party politicians
People from Eastern Region (Ghana)